Claudio Crocco (born 12 May 1958 in Buenos Aires, Argentina) is an Argentine former footballer who played for clubs in Argentina and Chile.

Teams 
  Ferro Carril Oeste 1975–1984
  Universidad de Chile 1984
  Ferro Carril Oeste 1985
  Platense 1986
  Unión de Santa Fe 1986–1987
  Sportivo Italiano 1987

Titles 
  Ferro Carril Oeste 1978 (Primera División B Championship), 1982 and 1984 (Primera División Argentina Championship)

External links 
 

1958 births
Living people
Argentine footballers
Argentine expatriate footballers
Club Atlético Platense footballers
Ferro Carril Oeste footballers
Unión de Santa Fe footballers
Sportivo Italiano footballers
Universidad de Chile footballers
Chilean Primera División players
Argentine Primera División players
Expatriate footballers in Chile
Association footballers not categorized by position
Footballers from Buenos Aires
20th-century Argentine people